The 2022 FIBA Under-17 Basketball World Cup (Spanish: Copa del Mundo de Baloncesto FIBA Sub-17 2022) was the seventh edition of the FIBA Under-17 Basketball World Cup, the biennial international men's youth basketball championship contested by the U17 national teams of the member associations of FIBA.

It was hosted by Spain from 2 to 10 July 2022. It was originally planned to be played in La Nucia and Alicante, then was moved to Malaga.

The United States won their sixth title with a win over Spain, while France defeated Lithuania for the bronze medal.

Qualified teams

Venue

Draw
The draw took place on 17 March 2022.

Seeding

Preliminary round
All times are local (UTC+2).

Group A

Group B

Group C

Group D

Final round

Bracket

Round of 16

9–16th classification playoffs

9–16th place quarterfinals

13–16th place semifinals

15th place game

13th place game

9–12th place semifinals

Eleventh place game

Ninth place game

Quarterfinals

5–8th classification playoffs

5–8th place semifinals

Seventh place game

Fifth place game

Semifinals

Third place game

Final

Final ranking

Statistics and awards

Statistical leaders

Players

Points

Rebounds

Assists

Blocks

Steals

Efficiency

Teams

Points

Rebounds

Assists

Blocks

Steals

Efficiency

Awards
The awards were announced on 11 July 2022.

References

External links
Official website
Tournament summary

2022
2022 in youth sport
International youth basketball competitions hosted by Spain
2022 in basketball
2022 in Spanish sport
Sport in Alicante
July 2022 sports events in Spain
2020s in Andalusia